Leonid Aleksandrovich Portenko (11 October 1896 – 26 May 1972) was a Soviet ornithologist of Ukrainian origin who carried out extensive zoogeographic studies on the birds of the northern and north-eastern Palaearctic realm. He was born in Smila, Ukraine, though most of his career was spent working in, and conducting expeditions from, the ornithological department of the Zoological Institute of the Soviet Academy of Sciences in Leningrad.

His publications include:
 1939, 1941 – Fauna of the Anadyr area
 1954, 1960 – The birds of the USSR
 1972–1973 – The birds of the Chukchi Peninsula and Wrangel Island
 1973 – Fauna of birds of non-polar parts of the Northern Urals
 1975 – The birds of zonal steppes and deserts of Central Asia

References

Further reading 
 Palmer R.S. 1973. Leonid Aleksandrovich Portenko. Auk 90: 487.

 
1896 births
1972 deaths
Soviet zoologists
Ukrainian ornithologists
People from Smila